Megachile tsingtauensis is a species of bee in the family Megachilidae. It was described by Strand in 1915.

References

Tsingtauensis
Insects described in 1915